Delta (uppercase Δ, lowercase δ or 𝛿; , délta) is the fourth letter of the Greek alphabet. In the system of Greek numerals it has a value of 4. It was derived from the Phoenician letter dalet 𐤃. Letters that come from delta include Latin D and Cyrillic Д.

A river delta (originally, the delta of the Nile River) is so named because its shape approximates the triangular uppercase letter delta. Contrary to a popular legend, this use of the word delta was not coined by Herodotus.

Pronunciation
In Ancient Greek, delta represented a voiced dental plosive . In Modern Greek, it represents a voiced dental fricative , like the "th" in "that" or "this" (while  in foreign words is instead commonly transcribed as ντ). Delta is romanized as d or dh.

Uppercase
The uppercase letter Δ is used to denote:
 Change of any changeable quantity, in mathematics and the sciences (more specifically, the difference operator); for example, in:the average change of y per unit x (i.e. the change of y over the change of x). Delta is the initial letter of the Greek word διαφορά diaphorá, "difference". (The small Latin letter d is used in much the same way for the notation of derivatives and differentials, which also describe change by infinitesimal amounts.)
 The Laplace operator:

 The discriminant of a polynomial equation, especially the quadratic equation:

 The area of a triangle

 The symmetric difference of two sets
 A macroscopic change in the value of a variable in mathematics or science
 Uncertainty in a physical variable as seen in the uncertainty principle
 An interval of possible values for a given quantity
 Any of the delta particles in particle physics
 The determinant of the matrix of coefficients of a set of linear equations (see Cramer's rule)
 That an associated locant number represents the location of a covalent bond in an organic compound, the position of which is variant between isomeric forms
 A simplex, simplicial complex, or convex hull
 In chemistry, the addition of heat in a reaction
 In legal shorthand, it represents a defendant
 In the financial markets, one of the Greeks, describing the rate of change of an option price for a given change in the underlying benchmark
 A major seventh chord in jazz music notation
 In genetics, it can stand for a gene deletion (e.g. the CCR5-Δ32, a 32 nucleotide/bp deletion within CCR5)
 The American Dental Association cites it (together with omicron for "odont") as the symbol of dentistry.
 The anonymous signature of James David Forbes.
 Determinacy (having a definite truth-value) in philosophical logic.
 In mathematics, the symbol ≜ (delta over equals) is occasionally used to define a new variable or function.

Lowercase

The lowercase letter δ (or 𝛿) can be used to denote:
 A change in the value of a variable in calculus
 A functional derivative in functional calculus
 An auxiliary function in calculus, used to rigorously define the limit or continuity of a given function
 The Kronecker delta in mathematics
 The degree of a vertex (graph theory)
 The Dirac delta function in mathematics
 The transition function in automata
 Deflection in engineering mechanics
 The force of interest in actuarial science
 The chemical shift of nuclear magnetic resonance in chemistry
 The relative electronegativity of different atoms in a molecule, δ− being more electronegative than δ+
 Text requiring deletion in proofreading; the usage is said to date back to classical times
 In some of the manuscripts written by Dr. John Dee, the character of delta is used to represent Dee
 A subunit of the F1 sector of the F-ATPase
 The declination of an object in the equatorial coordinate system of astronomy
 The dividend yield in the Black–Scholes option pricing formula
 Ratios of environmental isotopes, such as 18O/16O and D/1H from water are displayed using delta notation – δ18O and δD, respectively
 The rate of depreciation of the aggregate capital stock of an economy in an exogenous growth model in macroeconomics
 In a system that exhibits electrical reactance, the angle between voltage and current
 Partial charge in chemistry
 The maximum birrefringence of a crystal in optical mineralogy.
  An Old Irish voiced dental or alveolar fricative of uncertain articulation, the ancestor of the sound represented by Modern Irish dh

Computer encodings
 Greek Delta / Coptic Dalda

 Latin Delta

 Technical and Mathematical symbols

 Mathematical Delta

These characters are used only as mathematical symbols. Stylized Greek text should be encoded using the normal Greek letters, with markup and formatting to indicate text style.

See also

 ∆ (disambiguation)
 D, d
 Д, д
 ẟ - Latin delta
 ∂ - the partial derivative symbol, sometimes mistaken for a lowercase Greek letter Delta.
 ð - the small eth appears similar to a small delta, and also represents a d sound in some contexts
 Th (digraph)
 Thorn (letter)
 Greek letters used in mathematics, science, and engineering
 ∇ - Nabla symbol
 Delta Air Lines
 SARS-CoV-2 Delta variant

References

Greek letters